Zbudza is a village and municipality in Michalovce District in the Kosice Region of eastern Slovakia.

History
In historical records the village was first mentioned in 1235.

Geography
The village lies at an altitude of 130 metres and covers an area of 9.075 km2.
It has a population of about 540 people.

Ethnicity
The population is about 90% Slovak and 10% Gipsy in ethnicity.

Culture
The village has a small public library, and a football pitch.

Economy
The village has a grocery shop.

The nearest railway station is at Michalovce.

Gallery

See also
 List of municipalities and towns in Michalovce District
 List of municipalities and towns in Slovakia

External links

https://web.archive.org/web/20071116010355/http://www.statistics.sk/mosmis/eng/run.html

Villages and municipalities in Michalovce District
Zemplín (region)